The 2011–12 Premier Reserve League (officially known as the 2011–12 Barclays Premier Reserve League for sponsorship reasons) was the thirteenth season since the establishment of the Premier Reserve League.

The events in the senior leagues during the 2010–11 season saw Blackpool and West Ham United relegated and replaced by the promoted sides Norwich City & Swansea City. While Birmingham City were relegated from the Premier League and Queens Park Rangers were promoted to the Premier League, neither side decided to participate in the reserve league.

The geographical split of the 16 participating teams meant it was possible to drop the overcomplicated 2010–11 structure and revert to a simpler North & South structure.  The Northern league now consists of Blackburn Rovers, Bolton Wanderers, Everton, Liverpool, Manchester United, Newcastle United, Sunderland and Wigan Athletic.  Manchester City chose not to participate this season.  The Southern League consists of Arsenal, Aston Villa, Chelsea, Fulham (who have chosen to participate this season), Norwich City, Swansea City, West Bromwich Albion & Wolverhampton Wanderers

Each team played the teams in their own league home and away.  They also played each team in the other league once (home and away games split evenly).  This resulted in 22 league games (14 + 8).

At the conclusion of the league season, the two league winners played the final in the home ground of the Northern league winner.  The venue alternates between North & South each year.  Last year it was held at Stamford Bridge, the home of eventual champions Chelsea.

On 10 May 2012, Manchester United Reserves won the Play-off Final.

Tables

Premier Reserve League North
Final table

Premier Reserve League South
Final table

Rules for classification: 1st points; 2nd goal difference; 3rd goals scoredPos = Position; Pld = Matches played; W = Matches won; D = Matches drawn; L = Matches lost; F = Goals for; A = Goals against; GD = Goal difference; Pts = Points; C = Champions

Play-off Final 
At the conclusion of the league season, the two league winners played the final in the home ground of the Northern league winner.

Goal scorers

Premier Reserve League North

Own goals

Premier Reserve League South

Own goals

Promotion and relegation
Teams relegated from the Premier Reserve League at the end of this season:
 Bolton Wanderers
 Blackburn Rovers
 Wolverhampton Wanderers

Teams promoted to the Premier Reserve League at the end of this season:
 Reading
 Southampton
 West Ham

See also 
2011–12 Premier Academy League
2011–12 FA Youth Cup
2011–12 Premier League
2011–12 in English football

References

External links

Match reports 

Match reports can be found at each club's official website:

2011–12
2011–12 in English football leagues
Reserve